Lifestyle often refers to:
 Lifestyle (sociology), the way a person lives
 Otium, ancient Roman concept of a lifestyle
 Style of life, dealing with the dynamics of personality

Lifestyle may also refer to:

Business and economy
 Lifestyle business, a business that is set up and run with the aim of sustaining a particular level of income
 Lifestyle center, a commercial development that combines the traditional retail functions of a shopping mall with leisure amenities
 Lifestyle (department store), an Emirati retail fashion brand

Film and television

Channels
 Lifestyle (Australian TV channel), an Australian subscription television station
 Lifestyle (British TV channel), a defunct British television station
 Lifestyle (Philippine TV channel), a Philippine lifestyle and entertainment cable channel owned by ABS-CBN

Series and documentaries
 Lifestyle (GR series), a weekly entertainment news show that is broadcast on Alter Channel
Lifestyles of the Rich and Famous, a TV series often abbreviated as "Lifestyles"
 The Lifestyle (1999), an American documentary about swinging in the United States

Music
 Lifestyle (album), a 2000 album by the band Silkworm
 "Lifestyle" (Rich Gang song), 2014
 "Lifestyle" (Jason Derulo song), 2021
 "Lifestyle", a song by Joe Satriani from the 2004 album Is There Love in Space?
 "Lifestyle", a song by The Original 7ven from the 2011 album Condensate
 "Lifestyle", a song by Yo Gotti from the 2016 mixtape White Friday (CM9)

Other uses
 Life & Style (magazine)
 LifeStyles Condoms, a brand of condom made by the Australian company Ansell Limited

See also
 
 
 
 
 Lifestylism, a pejorative term to describe fringe anarcho politics and ethical groups
 Life (disambiguation)
 Style (disambiguation)
 Way of life (disambiguation)